The Ora Black Cat, also known as the Heimao or R1 is a battery electric city car produced by the Chinese car manufacturer Great Wall Motors and sold under its electric vehicle sub-brand, Ora, since 2019. The Black Cat was unveiled at the Shanghai Motor Show in April 2019.

Great Wall Motors announced that ORA R1 renamed to ORA Black Cat at the Chongqing Auto Show in July 2020.

Overview

The motor is a front-positioned  and 125 Nm permanent magnet motor.

The Ora R1 is priced between 59,800 and 77,800 yuan ($8,680 to US$11,293), making the R1 the world's cheapest electric car as of 2019.

Export markets
Great Wall Motors announced its introduction in India with its Haval and Ora brands, with the Black Cat being one of the first models to be introduced in India.

Ora has started activities in Latin America in 2020, and Costa Rica is one of the first countries receiving this new model. Starting at US$19.990, prices are significantly higher, although the Black Cat is still the cheapest electric car in the country.

References

External links

R1
2010s cars
Cars introduced in 2019
City cars
Front-wheel-drive vehicles
Hatchbacks
Forfour
Electric city cars
Production electric cars
Cars of China